Kivihaka (Finnish), Stenhagen (Swedish) is a neighborhood of Helsinki, Finland.

Haaga